Aulus Verginius Tricostus Caeliomontanus was a Roman politician active in the fifth century BC and was consul in 469 BC.

Family
He was the son of Aulus Verginius Tricostus Caeliomontanus, consul in 494 BC, and possibly the father of Titus Verginius Tricostus Caeliomontanus (consul 448 BC), consul in 448 BC. Alternatively, Titus might have been the son of Tricostus's brother Spurius Verginius Tricostus Caeliomontanus, consul in 456 BC. Dionysius of Halicarnassus reports his cognomen as Nomentanus but the inscription on the Fasti Capitolini more closely resembles the name Caeliomontanus.

Biography
In 469 BC, he was consul with Titus Numicius Priscus as his colleague. At the beginning of his term, they each led separate campaigns against the Aequi and the Volsci  who had both been setting fire to farmlands around Rome. Tricostus attacked the Aequi but faced difficulties, whereas Priscus fought the Volsci and captured Caenon, the port of Antium, which was the capital of the Volsci. He regrouped with Priscus in order to pillage the Sabine countryside in retaliation for a raid by the Sabines on Roman territory.

Two years later, in 467 BC, after having taken Antium from the Volsci, the Romans had established a colony there. Tricostus was, along with Titus Quinctius Capitolinus Barbatus and Publius Furius Medullinus Fusus, one of the three triumvirs (the triumviri agro dando) in charge of partitioning and distributing the lands of Antium to the colonists.

He is possibly the same person as the legate who served under the consul Titus Romilius Rocus Vaticanus against the Aequi in 455 BC.

Notes

Bibliography

Primary sources
 Dionysius of Halicarnassus, Roman Antiquities, Book IX
 Livy, The History of Rome, Books II-III

Secondary sources
 

5th-century BC Roman consuls
Tricostus Caeliomontanus, Aulus